Pedersen Nunatak is the westernmost of the Seal Nunataks, lying 8 nautical miles (15 km) northeast of Cape Fairweather, off the east coast of Antarctic Peninsula. First charted in 1947 by the Falkland Islands Dependencies Survey (FIDS), and named for Captain Morten Pedersen of the Norwegian sealer Castor, which operated in Antarctic waters during the 1893–94 season.

Further reading 
 R. L. Oliver, P. R. James, J. B. Jago, Antarctic Earth Science, PP 326, 348
 Defense Mapping Agency 1992, Sailing Directions (planning Guide) and (enroute) for Antarctica, P 277
 Valle, R., & Miller, H. (2001), Transpressional deformation along the margin of Larsen Basin: New data from Pedersen Nunatak, Antarctic Peninsula, Antarctic Science, 13(2), 158–166. doi:10.1017/S0954102001000244

References 

Nunataks of Graham Land
Oscar II Coast